Eulithis diversilineata, the lesser grapevine looper, is a moth in the  family Geometridae. The caterpillars are known to feed on Virginia creeper.

References

Cidariini
Moths described in 1813